Science & Education: Contributions from History, Philosophy, and Sociology of Science and Mathematics is a peer-reviewed academic journal published by Springer Science+Business Media. It covers the roles and uses of history and philosophy of science and sociology of science in the teaching of science and mathematics. , the editor-in-chief is Sibel Erduran, who succeeded Kostas Kampourakis (University of Geneva), who in turn succeeded founding editor Michael R. Matthews (University of New South Wales). According to the Journal Citation Reports, the journal has a 2017 impact factor of 1.265.

References

External links

Education journals
Philosophy journals
English-language journals
Springer Science+Business Media academic journals
Publications established in 1992
Science education journals